Mike Freeman (30 July 1937 – 26 August 2007) was a British bobsledder. He competed at the 1968 Winter Olympics and the 1972 Winter Olympics.

References

1937 births
2007 deaths
British male bobsledders
Olympic bobsledders of Great Britain
Bobsledders at the 1968 Winter Olympics
Bobsledders at the 1972 Winter Olympics
Sportspeople from London